The 2014–15 Serie A (known as the Serie A TIM for sponsorship reasons) was the 113th season of top-tier Italian football, the 83rd in a round-robin tournament, and the fifth since its organization under a league committee separate from Serie B. It began on 30 August 2014.

A total of 20 teams compete in the league: 17 sides from the 2013–14 season and three promoted from the 2013–14 Serie B campaign. Juventus were the defending champions, successfully defending their title for the fourth consecutive time. On 2 May 2015, Juventus won the scudetto for the fourth consecutive time.

Events

The season will feature the return of Palermo after only one season in the second division and Empoli, whose last appearance was in the 2007–08 season. Cesena, the play-off winner, returned to the top level after two years in Serie B.

The pre-season saw two ownership changes: Cagliari was sold from Massimo Cellino to Milanese entrepreneur Tommaso Giulini, a former board member at Internazionale. Sampdoria was sold by Edoardo Garrone (son of the late Riccardo Garrone) to Rome-based film businessman Massimo Ferrero.

The season was also influenced by serious financial problems surrounding Parma, involving two controversial takeovers during the season, its last chairman Giampietro Manenti being arrested on 18 March 2015 under accusation of money laundering, and the club being ultimately declared insolvent by the local court on the very next day.

The Serie A this season had the most goals on average than any of the five other top leagues in Europe.

Teams

Number of teams by region

Stadiums and locations

 Sassuolo plays in Reggio Emilia.

Personnel and sponsorship

 Additionally, referee kits are now being made by Diadora, and Nike has a new match ball, the Ordem Serie A.

Managerial changes

Ownership changes

League table

Results

Season statistics

Top goalscorers

Most clean sheets

Hat-tricks

References

External links

 

Serie A seasons
Italy
1